Ramkot is a village and tehsil in Kathua district of the Indian union territory of Jammu and Kashmir. The village is located about 80 kilometres from the district headquarter kathua.

Demographics
According to the 2011 census of India, Ramkot has 534 households. The literacy rate of Ramkote was 73.08% compared to 67.16% of Jammu and Kashmir. Male literacy stands at 79.55% while the female literacy rate was 65.99%.

Transport

Road
Ramkot is connected by road to other places in Jammu and Kashmir by the Challa-Dayalachak Road and NH 44.

Rail
The nearest railway station is Chak Dayala, located at a distance of 28 kilometres. The nearest major railway stations are Jammu Tawi railway station and Kathua railway station located at a distance of 83 kilometres and 55 kilometres respectively.

Air
The nearest airport to Ramkot is Jammu Airport located at a distance of 80 kilometres.

See also
Mankotia
Jammu and Kashmir
Kathua district
Kathua

References

Villages in Ramkot tehsil